Hetland is a former municipality in Rogaland county, Norway.  The municipality existed from 1838 until 1965 when it was dissolved.  The municipality included the Stavanger Peninsula and the land surrounding both sides of the Gandsfjorden, but not the area around the head of the fjord.  It originally encompassed the land surrounding the city of Stavanger in the present-day municipalities of Randaberg and Stavanger (except the city of Stavanger) and part of the municipality of Sandnes.  The main church for Hetland was Hetland Church (now named "Frue Church"). Upon its dissolution in 1965, the  municipality had 24,173 residents.

History

The parish of Hetland was established as a municipality on 1 January 1838 (see formannskapsdistrikt law). On 1 July 1922, the northwestern district of the municipality (population: 1,256) was separated to form the new municipality of Randaberg.  This split left Hetland with 10,167 residents.  The port city of Stavanger was located along the Gandsfjorden, adjacent to Hetland and as the city expanded over the years, areas of Hetland were annexed to join the city.  Such changes happened in 1867, 1879, 1906, 1923, and 1953.  Also on 1 January 1912, a small area in Høyland municipality (population: 41) was transferred to Hetland.

On 1 January 1965, there were many major municipal changes in Norway due to the work of the Schei Committee.  On that date, Hetland municipality was dissolved and its lands were transferred to its neighbors.  The parts of Hetland located east of the Gandsfjorden, namely the districts of Riska and Dale (population: 2,077) were merged into a much larger Sandnes municipality. The rest of Hetland, located on the west side of the fjord (population: 20,861) was merged into the municipality of Stavanger, greatly expanding its size.

Government
Hetland, as all municipalities in Norway, was responsible for primary education (through 10th grade), outpatient health services, senior citizen services, unemployment and other social services, zoning, economic development, and municipal roads.  The municipality was governed by a municipal council of elected representatives, which in turn elected a mayor.

Municipal council
The municipal council  of Hetland was made up of representatives that were elected to four year terms.  The party breakdown of the final municipal council was as follows:

See also
List of former municipalities of Norway

References

Stavanger
Sandnes
Randaberg
Former municipalities of Norway
1838 establishments in Norway
1965 disestablishments in Norway